is a Japanese anime television series produced by A-1 Pictures and directed by Kazuhiro Takamura. The series aired in Japan between January and March 2013 and is licensed in North America by Aniplex of America. Two manga adaptations have been published by ASCII Media Works. A PlayStation 3 video game adaptation by Bandai Namco Games was released in June 2013.

Plot
In the near future, an invention known as the  has solved all of the world's energy-related problems five years ago. This powerful machine creates energy from the sky and now lies in the centre of an artificial, man-made island called Blue Island. On another such island named Izu Ōshima, a girl named Akane Isshiki lives a peaceful life with her family. Her grandfather Kenjirou is a smart yet eccentric scientist who is also the inventor of the Manifestation Engine. Because of his invention, the world has entered a new era of peace. However, this peace didn't last for long.

Suddenly without warning, an alien force known as the  attack and invade Earth. Their prime objective is to destroy the Manifestation Engine so that they can send the world into chaos. Despite the human military forces hitting them with all they've got, they prove to be no match to the Alone's immense power.

She also recruits her classmates Aoi Futaba, Wakaba Saegusa and Himawari Shinomiya to join her in the fight. However, a mysterious girl is planning secretly behind the scenes to sabotage their efforts of defeating the Alone.

Characters

Main characters

Akane is a second-year junior high school student who is living together with her little sister and grandfather in Izu Oshima. She works many part-time jobs to support her family in place of her mother and rides the world's only flying bike that was made by her grandfather. Bright, energetic, honest and very athletic, she does have an odd habit of putting mayonnaise on anything she eats. She is given the power to transform using the Vivid System, where she is adorned in red. She has the ability to 'dock' with other Vivid users in order to become more powerful forms, activated by each girl kissing her on the forehead. She previously had a fear of heights following a factory explosion which killed her father and hospitalized her mother, but she overcame it in order to save Aoi.

Aoi is Akane's classmate and best friend. She comes to Oshima from Blue Island for medical treatment. She is the daughter of a wealthy family, and her parents are often too busy to visit Oshima. She gains access to the Vivid System around the same time as Akane, her color being blue. When docked with Akane, they combine into , possessing a powerful hammer several times the size of Aoi's Naked Impact. She was also able to use the Naked Rang as a jetpack after Akane was rendered unconscious by an Alone attack.

Wakaba is a determined sword fighter and captain of New Oshima Academy's Female Kendo Club who use Natural Harmony Style as her fighting style. She is also a classmate of Akane's and is the president of her class. She is competitive and hates to lose, but she also loves cute things, most often shown by her doting on Momo and Himawari. She is a bit awkward because of her earnestness, and she often draws the short straw. She gains access to the Vivid System after resolving to fight alongside Akane, her color being green. When docked with Akane, they combine into , able to increase the size of Wakaba's Naked Blade.

Himawari is a brilliant hacker and one of Akane's classmates. Following an incident when she was betrayed by a friend, she withdrew to her room and stopped coming to school, instead using a robotic camera to view classes. However, she soon starts coming back to classes after Akane helps her save a power plant, during which she gains access to the Vivid System, her color being yellow. She has a case of anthrophobia, and does not pay any attention to fashion or her appearance. She is a super hacker who favorites PCs and machines, enjoys factoryscapes and admires Kenjirou's work (hence her understanding of the Vivid System). Her main weapon is a set of remote controlled drones known as the  that provide various functions such as creating reflective shields. When docked with Akane, they become , making Himawari's Naked Collider more advanced.

Rei is a quiet girl in Akane's class who is often alone and does not speak to others except for class. She does however like animals and owns a parakeet named Piisuke. She comes from another world that was allegedly obliterated, along with her parents. She is approached by a mysterious black crow who allegedly promises her that she would be able to restore her world if she assists the Alone in destroying the Manifestation Engine. She possesses a black winged bow which she uses to fire glowing arrows into the Alone, giving them more powerful forms. She bears a mark of feathers on her neck, which indicates how many arrows she can fire, and she will allegedly disappear when she uses her last arrow. She also carries around a key that she considers very important. After Akane saves Rei from the grasps of the crow, she docks with her to become .

Supporting characters

Momo is Akane's little sister. She is a fifth grader, and the one in charge of the Isshiki family finances. She is a reliable girl who is great at cooking, and always backs up her sister, often worrying when she goes into action.

Kenjirō is Akane and Momo's grandfather and self-proclaimed mad scientist. He is one of the developers of the Manifestation Engine, but now he keeps a research lab in Izu Oshima and focuses on his inventions. He pours most of his money into his research, which is one reason why the Isshiki family is poor. He has stated that whilst he does own various patents, he chooses not to profit from them as atonement for the accident that occurred seven years ago. He is the developer of the Vivid System, which allows Akane and the others to fight against the Alone. However, as the result of an explosion that occurred upon completing the experiment, his mind has been transferred to the body of a stuffed otter named , with his human body kept in the fridge for preservation.

Mizuha is an officer of the National Defense Forces who becomes the homeroom teacher for Akane and the others.

Yūri is the management bureau head for the Manifestation Engine.

Mashiro is Akane and Momo's mother who is currently hospitalized following a factory explosion seven years ago.

Antagonists

She acts as an intermediary between the Alone and Rei, who she manipulates into assisting the Alone in targeting the Manifestation Engine with the promises of restoring her destroyed world and reuniting her with her parents. She often punishes Rei for interacting with humans. In the last two episodes she transforms into an ultimate Alone, Fallen Angel.

The Alone are a mysterious alien force from another dimension that takes many different forms and whose mission is to destroy the Manifestation Engine which, due to it providing 95% of the world's energy, will send the world into chaos if destroyed. When shot with arrows created by Rei, they can evolve into more powerful forms that are tougher to defeat, often aided with electromagnetism. All Alone are capable of firing red lasers from around their body. The Alone are often mechanical or resemble sediments, usually based on basic abstract imagery.

Media

Manga
A four-panel comic strip manga series, illustrated by Kotamaru and titled , was serialized between the November 2012 and May 2014 issues of ASCII Media Works' Dengeki G's Magazine. The first tankōbon volume was released on July 27, 2013; the second volume was released on May 27, 2014. A second manga, illustrated by Keito Koume and titled Vividred Operation, was serialized between the May 2013 and April 2014 issues of Dengeki G's Magazine. Two volumes, the first containing chapters published before the serialization, were released between February 27, 2013 and April 26, 2014.

Anime
The anime series, produced by A-1 Pictures, aired in Japan between January 11 and March 29, 2013 and was simulcast on Crunchyroll and Hulu. The series is directed by Kazuhiro Takamura, who had also worked on Strike Witches, and is written by Hiroyuki Yoshino, with character designs by Takamura. Hidari and Redjuice (a member of Supercell) handled the show's concept design. The series was released on six Blu-ray Disc and DVD compilation volumes in Japan between March 27 and August 28, 2013. Aniplex of America released the series on subtitled DVD in North America on December 17, 2013.

The series makes use of six pieces of theme music: one opening theme and five ending themes. The opening theme is "Energy" by Earthmind. The fifth ending theme, "Vivid Shining Sky" by Ayane Sakura, Rie Murakawa, Yuka Ōtsubo, Aya Uchida and Maaya Uchida, is used for episode six and onwards.

Video games
A video game developed by Banpresto, Vividred Operation: Hyper Intimate Power, was released by Bandai Namco Games for the PlayStation 3 via the PlayStation Network on June 20, 2013. A minigame titled  was released on the PlayStation Network on March 28, 2013.

Reception

Carl Kimlinger of Anime News Network gave Vividred Operation a B+ based on the first six episodes, saying, "The series' execution makes it easy to enjoy the story's strengths and hard to hold its many, many weaknesses against it." Dan Barnett of UK Anime Network gave the first three episodes an 8 out of 10, calling it "not to be missed", although he noted that "Vividred can't seem to decide what kind of an audience it's going for and has instead diluted the experience by trying to go for all of them at once. The show sits in a bit of an odd place where it'll be too tame for the majority of the audience who loved Strike Witches, yet at the same time it's still too racy and male-friendly to appeal to the young girls who are traditionally the audience for magical girl shows."

References

External links

  
 Vividred Operation video game website 
 Vividred Operation at Aniplex of America
 

2012 manga
2013 anime television series debuts
A-1 Pictures
Action video games
Anime with original screenplays
Animeism
ASCII Media Works manga
Dengeki G's Magazine
Japan-exclusive video games
Magical girl anime and manga
PlayStation 3 games
Seinen manga
Video games developed in Japan
Japan in fiction
Utopian fiction